Ontspanning Door Inspanning Juliana Combinatie Rosmalen, known as OJC Rosmalen is a football club from Rosmalen, Netherlands. OJC Rosmalen is the biggest amateur football club in the Netherlands.

OJC Rosmalen was founded in 1947 when two clubs merged; Juliana (1917) from Hintham and ODI (1910) from Rosmalen. The stadium is called Sportpark De Groote Wielen. The club plays in the Derde Divisie on Sundays.

External links
 

Football clubs in the Netherlands
Football clubs in 's-Hertogenbosch
Association football clubs established in 1947
1947 establishments in the Netherlands